Homaloptera manipurensis is a species of ray-finned fish in the genus Homaloptera.

Footnotes 
 

Homaloptera
Fish described in 1998